A blue sky law is a state law in the United States that regulates the offering and sale of securities to protect the public from fraud.  Though the specific provisions of these laws vary among states, they all require the registration of all securities offerings and sales, as well as of stockbrokers and brokerage firms.  Each state's blue sky law is administered by its appropriate regulatory agency, and most also provide private causes of action for private investors who have been injured by securities fraud.

The first blue sky law was enacted in Kansas in 1911 at the urging of its banking commissioner, Joseph Norman Dolley, and served as a model for similar statutes in other states. Between 1911 and 1933, 47 states adopted blue-sky statutes (Nevada was the lone holdout).  Today, the blue sky laws of 40 of the 50 states are patterned after the Uniform Securities Act of 1956. Historically, the federal securities laws and the state blue sky laws complemented and often duplicated one another. Much of the duplication, especially with regards to registration of securities and the regulation of brokers and advisors, was largely preempted by the Securities and Exchange Commission with the National Securities Markets Improvement Act of 1996 (NSMIA).  This act, however, left some regulation of investment advisors and much of the fraud litigation under state jurisdiction.  In 1998, state law securities fraud claims were expressly preempted by the Securities Litigation Uniform Standards Act from being raised in lawsuits that were effectively class actions by investors, even if not filed as class actions.

Origin of term in securities context
Its earliest cited use by the US Supreme Court was in an opinion by Justice Joseph McKenna in Hall v. Geiger-Jones Co., 242 U.S. 539 (1917), a case that addressed the constitutionality of state securities laws. Oddly, McKenna is frequently and erroneously given credit for inventing the term even though J. N. Dolley used the term when he was plumping for passage of the Kansas statute in 1910, and McKenna's own opinion in Hall itself attributes the term to an unnamed earlier source: 

Kansas Banking Commissioner Dolley, railing against "blue sky merchants" while he pushed for passage of the Kansas statute in 1910, observed that certain fraudulent investments were backed by nothing but the blue skies of Kansas. The Oxford English Dictionary has a cited use dating to 1906. Also, The New York Times (and other national newspapers) frequently reported on the blue sky laws as various states began to enact them between 1911 and 1916. The newspapers expressly used the term blue sky to describe such laws.

See also

 National Instrument 43-101, Canadian standards of disclosure for mineral properties, intended to help protect investors from fraudulent representation.
 Penny stock
 Securities market participants (United States)
 Securities regulation in the United States

Notes

References
List of State Securities Administrators
 

State law in the United States
United States securities law